Georges was a department store in Melbourne, Victoria, Australia, established in 1880 and closed in 1995.

Georges Store began as George & George's Federal Emporium, founded by brothers William and Alfred George, in 1880, moving in 1883 to a large four storey building at 280 Collins Street (originally 11-17 Collins Street East, which had been built in 1877 as Briscoe's warehouse). In 1888 they amalgamated with the Equitable Co-operative Store, located in a grand classical revival style building at 162-168 Collins Street (originally 89 Collins Street East) built in 1884, and designed by architects John Grainger and Charles D'Ebro. In September 1889 a disastrous fire destroyed their 280 Collins premises (which was then replaced by the first stage of the Block Arcade), after which they simply rebranded the 162-168 Collins Street location. In 1891 the building was refurbished and extended through to Little Collins Street, designed by D'Ebro alone.

By the early 1900s the store specialised in women's wear and accessories, and in 1908 (after financial restructuring) undertook a major renovation, inserting a full height atrium in the centre, and building extensive ‘walk-through’ show windows on Collins Street, to provide for window shoppers in a period when store hours were finally curtailed through labour laws.Another renovation in 1938 created a spacious uncluttered store interior, creating a more upmarket environment. In the late 1940s the store began to focus on catering to a more well heeled clientele, though anyone was welcome, and innovated with extra features such as stylish, minimalist window displays, regular fashion parades showing the latest styles, and later added an art gallery.  

Georges developed a reputation for superior quality equal to that enjoyed by Harrods or Fortnum & Mason of London, and Bergdorf Goodman of New York.  The store's motto was Quod facimus, Valde facimus (What we do, We do well), as the firm had a philosophy of providing exclusive goods and meticulous service. The stores' staff handbook instructed employees to avoid high pressure sales techniques. Author and customer Annette Cooper states that Georges: "wanted to foster loyalty, and if they made you feel good about coming into the store you would come back."

The firm was taken over by retail holding company Cox Brothers in November 1960 through the purchase of all the ordinary paid up capital in Georges Holding Limited. Cox Brothers began to incur loses in 1962/63 and went into receivership in 1966. Georges was listed (again) as a new company on the Melbourne Stock Exchange as Georges Australia Limited.

In January, 1970, Georges launched a successful takeover bid of Ball & Welch in a deal valued at $A1.48 million dollars. The directors of Georges believed that Ball & Welch stores would give Georges a foothold in the suburbs.  Instead, Georges closed all of the Ball & Welch stores by 1976 selling the flagship Flinders Street store in May, 1976.  

David Jones then took over Georges in 1981. During the 1980s, two smaller Georges' branches opened: The Jam Factory on Chapel Street, South Yarra, and the other on Burke Road, Camberwell.

The store closed on 5th October 1995.

A family anecdote 
George's remains such a well remembered part of Melbourne's history that the Powne family holds this personal connection to this day. William Powne was a migrant from Cornwall, who initially had a drapery business in Ballarat named Powne and Cray, and later worked for the George brothers when the store was still the Federal Emporium. In 1886, Powne gave notice that he would be leaving to start a drapery business in Clarendon Street, Melbourne. As a mark of esteem for Powne, the George brothers gave Powne a purse of sovereigns 'as a token of their respect and goodwill'. This kind act was perhaps so unusual, and the company so prominent, that it was reported in The Age on 14 September 1886. 

These sovereigns have been passed down through William Powne's children and beyond and in 2020 still continues, with the success story of George and George being front and centre.

References

Retail companies established in 1880
Australian companies established in 1880
Retail companies disestablished in 1995
Australian companies disestablished in 1995
Defunct department stores of Australia
Buildings and structures in Melbourne City Centre
Collins Street, Melbourne
History of Melbourne